Neuquenia is a genus of South American tangled nest spiders first described by Cândido Firmino de Mello-Leitão in 1940.  it contains only two species, both found in Argentina.

References

Amaurobiidae
Araneomorphae genera
Spiders of Argentina
Taxa named by Cândido Firmino de Mello-Leitão